William Henry Pell (1883 – 9 May 1915) was an English professional footballer who played as a right half in the Football League for Glossop.

Personal life 
Pell served as a private in the Northamptonshire Regiment during the First World War and was killed on the Western Front on 9 May 1915. He is commemorated on the Le Touret Memorial.

References

English Football League players
British Army personnel of World War I
1915 deaths
Sportspeople from Northamptonshire
Kettering Town F.C. players
Northampton Town F.C. players
Glossop North End A.F.C. players
British military personnel killed in World War I
Northamptonshire Regiment soldiers
Association football wing halves
English footballers

1883 births